The 2003 Taraba State gubernatorial election occurred on April 19, 2003. PDP candidate Jolly Nyame won the election, defeating ANPP Abubakar Saad and other 6 candidates.

Results
Jolly Nyame from the PDP won the election. 8 candidates contested in the election.

The total number of registered voters in the state was 1,026,950.

Jolly Nyame, (PDP)- 784,013
Abubakar Saad, ANPP- 102,879

References 

Taraba State gubernatorial election
Taraba State gubernatorial election
2003